Raymond George Kyle Allan (born 5 March 1955) is a retired Scottish footballer who made over 420 appearances in the Scottish League for Cowdenbeath as a goalkeeper. He is Cowdenbeath's record appearance-maker and was capped by Scotland at junior level.

Personal life 
Allan is the grandson of footballer George Kyle.

Career statistics

Honours
Brechin City

 Scottish League Second Division second-place promotion: 1992–93
 Scottish League Third Division second-place promotion: 1995–96

Glenrothes

 Fife Regional League (3): 1970–71, 1975–76, 1977–78
Fife Regional League East Division (1): 1978–79
 Fife & Lothians Cup (1): 1971–72
 Fife Junior Cup (4): 1971–72, 1975–76, 1976–77, 1978–79
 Cowdenbeath Cup (3): 1971–72, 1976–77, 1977–78
 East Fife Cup (1): 1971–72
Caledonian Cup (1): 1975–76
Fife Drybrough Cup (1): 1978–79
Montrave Cup (1): 1971–72

Individual

Cowdenbeath Hall of Fame

References

External links 

 

1955 births
Living people
People from Cowdenbeath
Scottish footballers
Association football goalkeepers
Scotland junior international footballers
Glenrothes F.C. players
Cowdenbeath F.C. players
Forfar Athletic F.C. players
Brechin City F.C. players
Motherwell F.C. players
Scottish Football League players
Raith Rovers F.C. players
Scottish Junior Football Association players